Wujiaochang is a station on Line 10 of the Shanghai Metro. It is located on Siping Road just south of the Wujiaochang roundabout in the city's Yangpu District. The station began operation on April 10, 2010.

References 

Railway stations in Shanghai
Shanghai Metro stations in Yangpu District
Railway stations in China opened in 2010
Line 10, Shanghai Metro